Houston Township is one of twenty-two townships in Adams County, Illinois, United States.  As of the 2020 census, its population was 186 and it contained 97 housing units.

Geography

Cities
 Golden (west edge)

Unincorporated towns
 Chatton

Cemeteries
The township contains three cemeteries: Ebenezer, Lutheran Friedhof and York Neck.

Major highways
  Illinois State Route 61
  Illinois State Route 94

Demographics
As of the 2020 census there were 186 people, 95 households, and 48 families residing in the township. The racial makeup of the township was 95.70% White, 0.00% African American, 0.54% Native American, 0.00% Asian, 0.00% Pacific Islander, 0.54% from other races, and 3.23% from two or more races. Hispanic or Latino of any race were 1.61% of the population.

There were 95 households, out of which 23.20% had children under the age of 18 living with them, 50.53% were married couples living together, 0.00% had a female householder with no spouse present, and 49.47% were non-families. 49.50% of all households were made up of individuals, and 41.10% had someone living alone who was 65 years of age or older. The average household size was 1.99 and the average family size was 2.96.

The township's age distribution consisted of 24.9% under the age of 18, none from 18 to 24, 33.3% from 25 to 44, 21.2% from 45 to 64, and 20.6% who were 65 years of age or older. The median age was 42.0 years. For every 100 females, there were 54.9 males. For every 100 females age 18 and over, there were 69.0 males.

The median income for a household in the township was $60,156, and the median income for a family was $106,875. Males had a median income of $51,458 versus $40,083 for females. The per capita income for the township was $30,087. None of the population was below the poverty line.

School districts
 Camp Point Community Unit School District 3
 Southeastern Community Unit School District 337

Political districts
 Illinois' 18th congressional district
 State House District 93
 State Senate District 47

References

External links
 List of Adams County township trustees
 City-Data.com
 Illinois State Archives

Townships in Adams County, Illinois
1849 establishments in Illinois
Townships in Illinois